Gaibandha is a town and district headquarters of Gaibandha District in northern Bangladesh. It is a centre of commerce and trade of the Gaibandha District and is located under the Rangpur Division. The area of the city is approximately 10.54 square kilometres.

It consists of nine wards. It is certified as a "ka" (A) category  Paurasava(municipality).

Name 
The city is named after its eponymous district. There are two opinions about the name of Gaibandha. The most famous opinion is: around five thousand years ago, capital of Matsya Kingdom of King Birat was in Gobindaganj area. "Matsa" means fish and "desh" means country(মাছের দেশ). Fishes were abundant in his kingdom so the term "Matsa Desh" was created. According to Mahabharata, king Birat had 60,000 cows which were frequently robbed by robbers. To protect his cattle from robbers, king Birat established a huge cattle-shed. The cattle were tied up alongside the rivers of this area. "Gai" means "cow" and "Bandha" means "to tie up". From this reason the area was called Gaibandha.

Nearby sites
 Shah Sultan Gazi's Mosque
 Balashi Ghat
 Mirer Bagan Zam-E Mosque
 Bardhan Kuthi
 Varatkhali Kastho Mandir
 Naldanga Zamindar Bari

References

Towns in Bangladesh
Populated places in Rangpur Division